Sebastian L. Anefal (born January 21, 1952 in Guror, Gilman municipality, Yap, Trust Territory of the Pacific Islands) is a Micronesian politician currently serving as the FSM Ambassador Plenipotentiary to Fiji. He was nominated by President Peter M. Christian to his current post in mid-2015 and took office on January 8, 2016.

He became the foreign minister of the Federated States of Micronesia on September 5, 2003, when his nomination was approved by the Micronesian Congress. Through foreign ministry work, he gained experiences in international politics and have addressed the United Nations general assembly on some occasions where Micronesia was concerned. Anefal also worked extensively with other world leaders to provide foreign aid to Micronesia for infrastructure projects and programs. He was the secretary of the department of resources and economic affairs prior to his appointment as Foreign Minister of FSM in 2002. He served as Foreign Minister of the Federated States of Micronesia from May 2002 until December 2006.

On January 8, 2007, he was inaugurated as the fifth Governor of his home state of Yap, a position he held for two terms.

Anefal ran unopposed for a second term in the Yapese gubernatorial election held on November 2, 2010. The combined ticket of Gov. Sebastian Anefal and Lt. Gov. Tony Tareg received 3,519 votes in the election. Anefal was sworn into his second, four-year term in office on January 10, 2011.

References

External links
 Address to United Nations General Assembly, Sept. 29, 2004

1952 births
Living people
Governors of Yap
Foreign Ministers of the Federated States of Micronesia
Federated States of Micronesia diplomats
Government ministers of the Federated States of Micronesia
People from Yap State